Infrastructure includes the basic physical and organizational structures needed for the operation of a society or enterprise, or the services and facilities necessary for an economy to function. This entry aggregates articles on and lists of modern infrastructure failures by category (type of infrastructure).

Structural 
 List of structural failures and collapses
 :Category:Collapsed buildings and structures
 List of bridge failures
 List of dam failures
 :Category:Dam failures
 Levee failures and breaches
 List of catastrophic collapses of radio masts and towers

Electrical and utility 
 Power outages
 2007 New York City steam explosion
 Electric power blackouts

Transportation 
 Lists of rail accidents
 Accidents and incidents involving commercial aircraft
 Airship accidents
 Accidents and disasters by death toll
 Road accidents
 Airliner accidents and incidents caused by in-flight structural failure
 Airliner accidents and incidents caused by mechanical failure

Nuclear 
 Nuclear accidents
 Nuclear and radiation accidents
 Military nuclear accidents
 Civilian nuclear power accidents
 Nuclear accidents and incidents

Space 
 Space Shuttle: Columbia disaster, Challenger disaster
 Space accidents and incidents

Other 
 Engineering failures
 Collapsed oil platforms

References

Lists of events
Infrastructure-related lists